The 2018–19 season was the ninth in the history of Melbourne City Football Club. In addition to the domestic league, Melbourne City competed in the FFA Cup for the fifth time.

Players

Squad information

Review

Pre-season
Melbourne City began their pre-season by playing two games in Kochi, India beating Indian club Kerala Blasters 6–0 and losing to Spanish club Girona FC 6–0. During August-October, the club played a training match each month, drawing with Adelaide United at Coopers Stadium and beating Adelaide United and Perth Glory at City Football Academy. On 12 October, Melbourne City played Western Sydney Wanderers in a friendly for the second season in a row at McEwen Reserve which ended in a 4–1 victory.

May
The club released five players on 3 May. Nick Fitzgerald, Bruce Kamau, and Ruon Tongyik were released to the Western Sydney Wanderers, while Christian Cavallo and Manny Muscat later joined Green Gully. Later in the month, Danish midfielder Michael Jakobsen left to join Adelaide United and Australian midfielder Stefan Mauk joined Brisbane Roar via return to his parent club N.E.C. in the Netherlands.

June
City signed four players in nine days with Anthony Cáceres signing a one-year loan from Manchester City once more. Scottish player, Michael O'Halloran joined City on a two-year contract from Rangers. Riley McGree signed a one-year deal from Belgian club, Club Brugge. Lastly, former Central Coast Mariners man, Lachlan Wales also signed a one-year deal.

Melbourne City's marquee man, Marcin Budziński mutual terminated his contract, while Oliver Bozanic joined Scottish club Heart of Midlothian at the conclusion of his Melbourne City contract. Finally, City teenager, Denis Genreau was loaned to PEC Zwolle for a season.

July
For the second season in a row, Luke Brattan's loan was extendend by another additional year on 5 July. On 19 July, Melbourne City signed Australian midfielder Rostyn Griffiths, following his time at Uzbek club Pakhtakor Tashkent.

August
On 7 August, Melbourne City played their first FFA Cup game against Brisbane Roar with Luke Brattan suffering a big injury blow. His injury was on for a long time from the 36th minute. It was already past half-time, but referee kept the time of the game go on. When the full 90 minutes were up, the second half was restarted with the game almost being the longest FFA Cup match. It was still goalless then, so extra time came. In the 120th minute, Bruno Fornaroli's big strike in the top-left corner sent Melbourne City 1–0 clear to move to the Round of 16.

On 29 August, Bruno Fornaroli was again the hero for Melbourne City, scoring a goal outside the box hitting the top-right hand side of the net, giving Melbourne City a 1–0 win against Newcastle Jets sending them to the quarter-finals.

On 9 August, City's promising young talent, Daniel Arzani joined Manchester City, with the expectation to be immediately loaned out to Celtic. On 30 August, Melbourne City signed French attacking midfielder Florin Berenguer from Sochaux as a visa player. Melbourne City then made their second loan to PEC Zwolle, with goalkeeper Dean Bouzanis joining Denis Genreau on loan for the season.

September
Three new players signed for Melbourne City in mid-September. After three years in Europe, Mark Birighitti signed a three-year deal to return to the A-League and replace Bouzanis who was loaned-out, Ritchie De Laet signed on a one-year loan from Aston Villa and was designated as a marquee player, and defender Curtis Good, who played for the club in 2012, returned on a one-year deal.

On 19 September, Melbourne City played in their quarter-finals for the FFA Cup against Western Sydney Wanderers at AAMI Park. City lost 2–1 loss, with Riley McGree scoring his first goal for the club, and were knocked-out of the cup.

October
The former Western Sydney Wanderers midfielder, Kearyn Baccus signed for Melbourne City as an injury replacement for Michael O'Halloran who suffered a hamstring injury.

On 20 October, City played their first game of the season which ended in a 2–1 victory over their derby rivals, Melbourne Victory, placing them at the top of the table at the end of the round along with Wellington Phoenix. Ritchie De Laet and Riley McGree scored City's goals.

November
The month of November didn't turn out well for Melbourne City. On 2 November, City again couldn't find a victory against Sydney FC still when City's last win against Sydney FC was a 1–0 victory in the 2016 FFA Cup Final. They were redeeming themselves after a 2–0 win against Wellington Phoenix on 9 November. On 24 November, City were again struggling to try and mostly win at Suncorp Stadium, Brisbane after a 2–0 defeat from Brisbane Roar.

December
Melbourne City played their first game against Newcastle Jets for the season which ended in a 3–0 win, with Riley McGree scoring with only two minutes played, along with Luke Brattan who scored a long volley from outside the box to double City's advantage in stoppage time, as then the speedster, Lachlan Wales scored his first goal for City with a long run to tap the ball home through the legs of Glen Moss.

On the 8th, City's was facing the top of the table's team, Perth Glory. It ended in a disappointing 1–0 loss with the only goal coming from Chris Ikonomidis. Curtis Good with 10 minutes to go, had also been sent off with a second yellow card.

Melbourne City redeemed themselves again with a 2–0 win over Adelaide United with Jordan Elsey scoring an own goal from a crossing ball from Ramy Najjarine. Luke Brattan finished it off with a bullet into the bottom left corner, with Paul Izzo getting a hand to the ball, but couldn't keep it out. The celebration had Brattan using the corner flag as a golf club as he looked like he was playing golf.

The final game for City in December, was the second Melbourne Derby of the season which Victory wanted to win for a seventh straight win of the season. The Swedish World Cup international striker, Ola Toivonen tapped the opening goal for Victory. City in stoppage time scored the equalizer with Dario Vidošić directing the header into back of the net. It resulted into a 1–1 draw.

January
January was a start that the Melburnians were dreaming for. Melbourne City faced the Western Sydney Wanderers on New Year's Day, with a 2–0 win over them. Two goals were in quick succession for City with Lachlan Wales and Ritchie De Laet both scoring in 3 minutes.

On the 2nd, Anthony Cáceres loan ended leaving City to Manchester City as he also signed for Sydney FC in the transfer on another one-year loan. The next day the youngster, Anthony Lesiotis was released to Melbourne Victory.

With the two Anthony's gone, City again was playing against Newcastle Jets at home result was a 2–1 win for City with Riley McGree and Luke Brattan again scoring the two first two goals when facing Newcastle.

On the 8th, Michael O'Halloran left City in a mutual-contract termination leaving City with only two forwards in their squad, being left with Bruno Fornaroli and Gianluca Iannucci.

Three days later, Melbourne City then faced Brisbane Roar at AAMI Park which ended in a 1–0 win with Ritchie De Laet scoring his fifth goal of the season.

On a Wednesday night in Gosford, Central Coast Mariners was hosting City for the second and last time for the season. The result was a heartbreaking 2–1 loss for City over bottom-of-the-table Mariners. The second goal for the Mariners, was from Matt Simon as Galekovic saved a penalty from Simon with the ball rebounding back to him and scoring on the other side of the net in the 89th minute which handed the Mariners their first win of the season.

On the 19th, City was facing the top-of-the table side, Perth Glory at home. Many chances came on for both teams, and eventually ended in a  goalless game (0–0).

On the 22nd, City played the Western Sydney Wanderers and had one of AAMI Park's highest-scoring games with the game ending in a 4–3 win for Melbourne City. Bart Schenkeveld was the hero and won the game for City in stoppage time.

February
With no star-man, up front including the marquee man Bruno Fornaroli; Jamie Maclaren and Shayon Harrison had signed for City in the opening two days of February. Maclaren was a signing for four years, which is almost the exact same time, Bruno Fornaroli had been into the club. Shayon Harrison (on loan from Tottenham Hotspur) signed on a one-year loan.

On 3 March, Melbourne City travelled to Jubilee Oval to face Sydney FC with no Maclaren or Harrison within their starting lineup. The game then resulted into a 2–0 loss.

Jamie Maclaren and Shayon Harrison had returned to their match-day squad for a home clash against Adelaide United (9 February) with both of them in the Starting XI up front. Maclaren had opened his account with his first goal for Melbourne City and then ended in a 1–1 draw.

On the 15th, played for the third and final time against Newcastle Jets which this time ended in a 3–1 loss with again Jamie Maclaren scoring the goal for City which was now two-in-two, for the Melbourne number 29.

Bruno Fornaroli had finally called his time to depart Melbourne City on the 26th.

Transfers

Transfers in

Transfers out

Contract extensions

Technical staff

Pre-season and friendlies

Friendlies

Toyota Yaris LaLiga World

Competitions

Overall record

A-League

League table

Results summary

Results by round

Matches

Finals series

FFA Cup

Statistics

Appearances and goals
Includes all competitions. Players with no appearances not included in the list.

Disciplinary record
Includes all competitions. The list is sorted by squad number when total cards are equal. Players with no cards not included in the list.

Clean sheets
Includes all competitions. The list is sorted by squad number when total clean sheets are equal. Players with no clean sheets not included in the list.

References

External links
 Official Website

2018–19 A-League season by team
Melbourne City FC seasons